The Worcester Boer War Memorial was unveiled near Worcester Cathedral in 1908.  The war memorial commemorates casualties of the Second Boer War from the county of Worcestershire.  It was designated a Grade II* listed building in 1999.

The memorial comprises a bronze sculptural group mounted on an octagonal Portland stone plinth and base, standing on three steps.  The front of the plinth bears the inscription: 'IN GRATEFUL / MEMORY OF / THE MEN OF / WORCESTER-/ SHIRE WHO IN / SOUTH AFRICA / GAVE THEIR / LIVES FOR THEIR / COUNTRY. / A.D.1899-1902." A further inscription on the stone base quotes from Ecclesiasticus: "Their bodies are buried in peace; / but their name liveth for evermore. Ecclus XLIV 14"

The bronze sculpture by William Robert Colton depicts a soldier of the Worcestershire Regiment, bare-headed and bare-armed, with a bandolier of bullets, kneeling with a bayonet affixed to his rifle held in a high "ready" position, in front of a standing winged female figure (various in various sources as an angel, or a Winged Victory, or a personification of "Immortality") with her left hand gripping a sheathed sword girt with a laurel wreath and the right holding an olive branch (or possibly a  palm branch) over the head of the soldier.

The memorial was unveiled on 23 September 1908 by General Sir Neville Lyttelton, on a site to the north of Worcester Cathedral.  It stands close to the passing A44.

See also
 Royal Artillery Boer War Memorial

References

 South African War Memorial, National Heritage List for England, Historic England
 Worcester (Men of Worcestershire South African/Boer War sculpture, War Memorials Online
 Men Of Worcestershire South African War, Imperial War Museums
 Statues in Worcester

Buildings and structures completed in 1908
Buildings and structures in Worcester, England
Grade II* listed buildings in Worcestershire
Grade II* listed monuments and memorials
Second Boer War memorials